In Marxist philosophy, a character mask is a prescribed social role which conceals the contradictions of a social relation or order. The term was used by Karl Marx in published writings from the 1840s to the 1860s, and also by Friedrich Engels. It is related to the classical Greek concepts of mimesis (imitative representation using analogies) and prosopopoeia (impersonation or personification), and the Roman concept of persona, but also differs from them. Neo-Marxist and non-Marxist sociologists, philosophers and anthropologists have used character masks to interpret how people relate in societies with a complex division of labour, where people depend on trade to meet many of their needs. Marx's own notion of the character mask was not a fixed idea with a singular definition.

Versus social masks
As a psychological term, "character" is more common in continental Europe, while in Britain and North America the term "personality" is used in approximately the same contexts. Marx however uses the term "character mask" analogously to a theatrical role, where the actor (or the characteristics of a prop) represents a certain interest or function, and intends by character both "the characteristics of somebody" and "the characteristics of something". Marx's metaphorical use of the term "character masks" refers to carnival masks and the masks used in classical Greek theatre. The issue is the social form in which a practice is acted out.

Sophisticated academic language about the sociology of roles did not exist in the mid-19th century. Thus, Marx borrowed from theatre and literature to express his idea. György Lukács pioneered a sociology of drama in 1909, a sociology of roles began only in the 1930s, and a specific sociology of theatre (e.g. by Jean Duvignaud) first emerged in the 1960s. Marx's concept is both that an identity appears differently from its true identity (it is masked or disguised), and that this difference has practical consequences. The mask is not a decoration, but performs a function and has effects, even independently of the mask bearer.

The closest equivalent term in modern English is social masks. However, this translation is inappropriate:
A "social mask" is a mask of an individual, while Marx's concept of character masks is applied to cases other than individuals, when matters present themselves differently from their true nature. Marxists and non-Marxists have applied it to persons and politicians, groups and social classes, mass media, social movements and political parties, social institutions, organizations and functions, governments, symbolic expressions, historical eras, and dramatic, literary or theatrical contexts.
The category of "social masks" is much more general and inclusive, and Marx's character masks are a subtype of social mask. They are masks of people and things which represent a social, political, intellectual or economic function, within given social relationships among groups of people. 
Marx's character masks are bound up with a specific type of society at a specific historical time, and with a specific theory of how the social relations in that society function. However, the concept of "social masks" assumes no specific theory, society or historical time. Social masks can be assumed to have existed forever, and are treated as a permanent part of human existence.

"False awareness"
There is a link between character masks and deliberate misrepresentation or hypocrisy. But character masks are not always hypocritical, as the motive for their use is genuine, principled or naive – or a product of self-delusion. People can mask their behavior, or mask a situation, without being aware that they are doing so. Paul Ricœur explains:

"False awareness" (''), as used by Friedrich Engels, does not refer to errors in the content of awareness. It refers to an absence of awareness of what is behind the ideas being worked with, how they originated, or what the real role or effect of the ideas is. The first result of this is that the ideologists believe they are performing certain intellectual operations with regard to an issue, which, in reality, have a different significance than they expect. The second result is that their intellectual creations can then function as a mask for what is really at stake, as they portray the issue in a one-sided or distorted way – without them being aware of how that works. The ideologists are aware and unaware at the same time. The problem, says Engels, is that they exaggerate the power of ideas, to the point where ideas appear to cause everything that happens. This occurs more often if the intellectual productions are quite distant from the practical context, or if they concern specialized, highly abstract ideas which are difficult to verify.

Levels of masking

Historical
According to Marx and Engels, character masks of an era are the main symbolic expressions of self-justification or apologia, which disguises, embellishes or obscures social contradictions ("the bits that do not fit"). A mystical truth in this context is a cultural idea which cannot be verified, because it is abstract rather than logical. Mystical truths cannot be tested scientifically, only subjectively experienced.

Economic
Marx argues that, as capitalist class society is intrinsically a contradictory system – it contains many conflicting and competing forces – masking of its true characteristics is an integral feature of how it operates. Buyers and sellers compete with other buyers and sellers. Businesses cannot practically do so without confidentiality and secrecy. Workers compete for job opportunities and access to resources. Capitalists and workers compete for their share of the new wealth that is produced, and nations compete with other nations. The masks are therefore necessary, and the more a person knows about others, the more subtle and sophisticated the masks become.

A centerpiece of Marx's critique of political economy is that the labour contract between a worker and their employer obscures the true economic relationship. Marx argues that workers do not sell their labor, but their labor power, creating a profitable difference between what they are paid and the value they create for the employer (a form of economic exploitation). Thus, the foundation of capitalist wealth creation involves a mask. More generally, Marx argues that transactions in the capitalist economy are rarely transparent – they appear different from what they really are. This is discovered only when the total context in which they occur is examined. Hence Marx writes:

This implies another level of masking, because the economic character masks are then equated with authentic behaviour. The effect in this case is, that the theories of economics masks how the economy actually works, by describing its surface appearance as its real nature. The general principles of economics may appear to explain it, but in reality they do not. The theory is therefore ultimately arbitrary. Either aspects of the economy are studied in isolation from the context in which they occur, or generalizations are formed which leave essential parts out. These distortions are ideologically useful to justify an economic system, position or policy as reasonable, but it is a hindrance to true understanding.

Significance

Masks as mediators of social contradictions
Abstractly, the masking processes specific to capitalist society mediate and reconcile social contradictions, which arise from three main sources:

 relations of production (ownership relations governing the factors of production, defined by property rights, and work roles), which create and maintain a class-divided society, in which citizens are formally equal under the law but unequal in reality; class interests are represented as the general interest and vice versa. The state formally serves "the general interest" of society, but in reality it mainly serves the general interest of the ruling class, and more specifically what the elite, the polity or the political class considers to be the general interest of society.
 relations of exchange in the marketplace, where buyers and sellers bargain with each other, and with other buyers and sellers, to get the "best deal" for themselves, although they have to cooperate to get it (they must give something to receive something). Supposedly this is a "level playing field" but in reality it is not, simply because some command vastly greater resources than others. The attempt is made to "personalize" otherwise impersonal or anonymous market relationships expressed by transactions.
 the combination of relations of production and exchange, in which competitors have an interest in hiding certain information, while presenting themselves outwardly in the most advantageous way. Specifically, people are placed in the position where they both have to compete and to cooperate with each other at the same time, at a very advanced (or at least civilized) level, and to reconcile this predicament involves them in masking. This requirement exists in all kinds of types of society, but in bourgeois society it takes specific forms, reflecting the element of financial gain which is involved in the way people are relating or are related.

"Naked self-interest"
In The Communist Manifesto, Marx & Engels had stated that:

This "naked self-interest" seems to contradict the idea of "masking" in bourgeois society. Supposedly market trade creates transparency and an "open society" of free citizens. In reality, Marx and Engels claim, it does not. The "nakedness" may not reveal very much other than the requirements of trade; it is just that the cultural patterns of what is hidden and what is revealed differ from feudal and ancient society. According to Marx, the labour market appears as the "very Eden of the innate rights of man", insofar workers can choose to sell their labour-power freely, but in reality, workers are forced to do so, often on terms unfavourable to them, to survive. As soon as they are inside the factory or office, they have to follow orders and submit to the authority of the employer.

Even in "naked commerce", the possible methods of "masking" what one is, what one represents or what one does, are extremely diverse. Human languages and numerical systems, for example, offer very subtle distinctions of meaning that can "cover up" something, or present it as different from what it really is. Anthropologists, sociologists and linguists have sometimes studied "linguistic masking".

The "masking" of quantitative relationships takes three main forms:

masking plain computational error;
masking through a categorization of counting units which hides the real situation, or presents it in a certain light;
masking through the ("meta-theoretical") interpretation of the overall significance of a quantitative result.

Data may be accepted as a valid result, but dismissed as irrelevant or unimportant in a given context, and therefore not worth paying attention to; or conversely, the importance of specific data may be highlighted as being more important than other related facts.

Sources of the concept

Marx's studies of Greek philosophy
The theatrical mask, expressing an acting role, was supposedly first invented in the West by the Greek actor Thespis of Attica (6th century BC) and the Greek Aristotelian philosopher Theophrastus (circa 371–287 BC) is credited with being the first in the West to define human character in terms of a typology of personal strengths and weaknesses. Indeed, Marx's idea of character masks appears to have originated in his doctoral studies of Greek philosophy in 1837–39. At that time, the theatre was one of the few places in Germany where opinions about public affairs could be fairly freely aired, if only in fictionalized form.

Independently from Marx, the romantic novelist Jean Paul also used the concept, in portraying the human problems of individuation. In Jean Paul's aesthetics, the Charaktermaske is the observable face or appearance-form of a hidden self. It is Jean Paul's definition which is cited in the Deutsches Wörterbuch compiled by Jacob Grimm and Wilhelm Grimm from 1838 onward.

Other early literary uses of the German term charaktermaske are found in Joseph von Eichendorff's 1815 novel Ahnung und Gegenwart, a veiled attack against Napoleon, and some years later, in writings by Heinrich Heine. Heine was among the first to use the theatrical term "Charaktermaske" to describe a social setting. Perhaps the concept was also inspired by Hegel's discussion of masks in his The Phenomenology of Spirit. In his Aesthetics, Hegel contrasts the fixed, abstract and universal character masks of the Commedia dell'arte with the romantic depiction of "character" as a living, subjective individuality embodied in the whole person.

In 1841, the German theatre critic Heinrich Theodor Rötscher explicitly defined a "character mask" as a theatrical role, acted out in such a way that it expresses all aspects of the assumed personality, his/her social station and background; successfully done, the audience would be able to recognize this personality on first impression.

Theatre and drama
The shift in Marx's use of the concept, from dramaturgy and philosophy to political and economic actors, was probably influenced by his well-known appreciation of drama and literature. Certainly, European writers and thinkers in the 17th and 18th centuries (the era of the Enlightenment) were very preoccupied with human character and characterology, many different typologies being proposed; human character was increasingly being defined in a secular way, independent of virtues and vices defined by religion.

Polemics
The first known reference by Marx to character masks in a publication appears in an 1846 circular which Marx drafted as an exile in Brussels. It occurs again in his polemic against Karl Heinzen in 1847, called Moralizing criticism and critical morality and in part 5 of a satirical piece written in 1852 called Heroes of the Exile.

The 18th Brumaire
In chapter 4 of The 18th Brumaire of Louis Napoleon (1852), a story about the sovereign's dissolution of the French legislative assembly in 1851 in order to reign as imperial dictator, Marx describes how Napoleon abandoned one character mask for another, after dismissing the Barrot-Falloux Ministry in 1849. In this story, character masks figure very prominently. Contrary to Hegel's belief that states, nations, and individuals are all the time the unconscious tools of the world spirit at work within them, Marx insists that:

Alfred Meissner
In 1861–63, the Austrian writer Alfred Meissner, the "king of the poets" criticized by Engels in his 1847 essay The True Socialists, published three volumes of novels under the title Charaktermasken. It is unclear whether Marx was aware of this, but according to Jochen Hörisch it gave the term "character mask" a certain popularity among German speakers.

Abandoning the concept
Character masks are mentioned five times in Capital, Volume I, and once in Capital, Volume II. Here, the reference is specifically to economic character masks, not political character masks. However, both the official Moscow translation of Capital, Volume I into English, as well as the revised 1976 Penguin translation of Capital, Volume I into English by Ben Fowkes, deleted all reference to character masks, substituting a non-literal translation. English translators of other writings by Marx & Engels, or of classical Marxist texts, quite often deleted Charaktermaske as well, and often substituted other words such as "mask", "role", "appearance", "puppet", "guise" and "persona".

Marx's concept of character masks has therefore been little known in the English-speaking world, except through the translated writings of the Frankfurt School and other (mainly German or Austrian) Marxists using the term. Tom Bottomore's sociological dictionary of Marxist thought has no entry for the important concept of character masks. The Penguin Dictionary of Critical Theory likewise does not refer to it. David Harvey, the world-famous New Left popularizer of Marx's writings, does not mention the concept at all in works such as his The Limits to Capital. Likewise Fredric Jameson, the famous commentator on post modernity, offers no analysis of the concept. There is no entry for the concept in James Russell's Marx-Engels Dictionary, in Terrell Carver's A Marx Dictionary or in the Historical Dictionary of Marxism.

Jochen Hörisch claims that "despite its systematic importance, the concept of character masks was conspicuously taboo in the dogmatic interpretation of Marx".

However, Dieter Claessens mentions the concept in his 1992 Lexikon, there is another mention in Lexikon zur Soziologie and the more recent German-language Historical-Critical Dictionary of Marxism has a substantive entry for character masks by Wolfgang Fritz Haug. Haug suggests that the conjunction of "character" and "mask" is "specifically German", since in the French, English, Spanish, and Italian editions of Capital, Volume I, the term "mask", "bearer" or "role" is used, but not "character mask". But since "character mask" is a technical term in theatre and costume hire – referring both to physical masks expressing specific characters (for example, Halloween masks), and to theatrical roles – it is not "specifically German", and most existing translations are simply inaccurate. However, Haug is correct insofar as "character mask" as a sociological or psychological term is rarely used by non-German speakers.

Marx's argument in Das Kapital

Marx's argument about character masks in capitalism can be summarized in six steps.

Roles
The first step in his argument is that when people engage in trade, run a business or work in a job, they adopt and personify (personally represent) a certain function, role or behaviour pattern which is required of them to serve their obligations; their consent to the applicable rules is assumed, as a necessity to succeed in the activities. They have to act this way, because of the co-operative relationships they necessarily have to work with in the division of labour. People have to conform to them, whether they like it or not. If they take on a role, they have to fulfill the packet of tasks which is part of the job.

People are initially born into a world in which these social relationships already exist, and "socialized" into them in the process of becoming "well-adjusted adults" – to the point where they internalize their meaning, and accept them as a natural reality. Consequently, they can learn to act spontaneously and automatically in a way consistent with these social relations, even if that is sometimes a problematic process.

Interests
The second step in his argument is that, in acting according to an economic function, employees serve the impersonal (business, legal or political) interests of an abstract authority, which may have little or nothing to do with their own personal interests. They have to keep the two kinds of interests separated, and "manage them" appropriately in a "mature, professional" way. In this way, they "personify" or "represent" interests, and who they personally are, may be completely irrelevant to that – it is relevant only to the extent that their true personality fits with the role.

People are slotted into functions where they have characteristics which are at least compatible with the functions. They always have a choice in how they perform their role and how they act it out, but they have no choice about taking it on. If they succeed in their role, they can advance their position or career, but if they fail to live up to it, they are demoted or fired. Human individuality is then conceptualized in terms of the relationship between buyer and seller.

Masking
The third step in his argument is, that the practices just described necessarily lead to the "masking" of behaviors and personalities, and to a transformation of personality and consciousness. It is not just that people can rarely be "all of themselves" while performing a specialized function in the division of labour, and must also express something new and different. There are also many competing, conflicting and contradictory interests at stake – and these must somehow be dealt with and reconciled by the living person.

Different interests have to be constantly mediated and defended in everyday behaviour, with the aid of character masks; these masks exist to mediate conflict. It means that people are obliged or forced to express certain qualities and repress other qualities in themselves. In doing this, however, their own consciousness and personality is altered. To be part of an organization, or "rise to the top" of an organization, they have to be able to "act out" everything that it requires in a convincing way, and that can only happen if they either have, or acquire, real characteristics which are at least compatible with it. That requires not just an "acculturation" process, but also sufficient behavioral flexibility, intelligence, acumen and creativity – so that a person does not inappropriately "fall out of the role". Discord between identity and function is tolerated only in contexts where it does not matter.

Inversion
The fourth step in his argument concerns an inversion of subject and object. It is not just that the commercial relationships between things being traded begins to dominate and reshape human behaviour, and remake social relations. In addition, human relations become the property of things. Inanimate things, and the relationships between them, are endowed with human characteristics. They become "actors" relating in their own right to which people much adjust their behaviour, and they are also theorized in that way. This is a special case of anthropomorphism because it occurs within human relations, not in relation to an object external to them.

A symbolic language and way of communicating emerges, in which inanimate "things" are personified. A market (or a price, or a stock, or a state etc.) gains an independent power to act. Marx calls this commodity fetishism (or more generally, "fetishism"), and he regards it as a necessary reification of the symbolizations required to traverse life's situations in bourgeois society, because the relationships between people are constantly being mediated by the relationships between things. It means that people are eventually unable to take their mask off, because the masks are controlled by the business relationships between things being traded, and by broader legal, class, or political interests. If they are actually unable to take the mask off, they have effectively submitted fully to the power of abstract, impersonal market forces and legal rules. As many philosophical texts suggest, by being habituated to a role, the role is internalized by individuals, and becomes part of their personality: they become the thing that they acted out.

Alienation
The fifth step in the argument is that on the world's stage, the "dance of masked people, and of the things they have endowed with an independent power to act and relate" leads to pervasive human alienation (the estrangement of people from themselves, and from others in contacts which have become impersonal and functional). It durably distorts human consciousness at the very least, and at worst it completely deforms human consciousness. It mystifies the real nature, and the real relationships, among people and things – even to the point where they can hardly be conceived anymore as they really are.

The masks influence the very way in which realities are categorized. People's theorizing about the world also becomes detached from the relevant contexts, and the interpretation of reality then involves multiple "layers" of meanings, in which "part of the story" hides the "whole story". What the whole story is, may itself become an almost impenetrable mystery, about which it may indeed be argued that it cannot be solved. The real truth about a person may be considered unknowable, but as long as the person can function normally, it may not matter; one is judged simply according to the function performed.

In what Marx calls "ideological consciousness", interests and realities are presented other than they really are, in justifying and defining the meaning of what happens. People may believe they can no longer solve problems, simply because they lack the categories to "think" them, and it requires a great deal of critical and self-critical thought, as well as optimism, to get beyond the surface of things to the root of the problems.

Development
The last step is that effectively capitalist market society develops human beings in an inverted way. The capitalist economy is not primarily organized for the people, but people are organized for the capitalist economy, to serve others who already have plenty of wealth. In an increasingly complex division of labour offering little job security, there is more and more external pressure forcing people to act in all kinds of different roles, masking themselves in the process; by this act, they also acquire more and more behavioural and semiotic flexibility, and develop more and more relational skills and connections. The necessity to work and relate in order to survive thus accomplishes the "economic formation of society" at the same time, even if in this society people lack much control over the social relations in which they must participate. It is just that the whole development occurs in an imbalanced, unequal and uncoordinated way, in which the development of some becomes conditional on the lack of development by others.

Commercial interests and political class interests ultimately prevail over the expressed interests of individuals. In the periodic economic crises, masses of people are condemned to the unemployment scrapheap, no matter what skills they may have; they are incompatible with the functioning of the bourgeois system, "collateral rubbish" that is swept aside. Even highly developed people can find that society regards them as worthless – which quite often tends to radicalize their opinions (see extremism and radicalization).

Revolution
A seventh step could in principle be added, namely a big crisis in society which sparks off a revolution and overturns the existing capitalist system. In that case, it could be argued, the false masks are torn off, and people have to stand up for what they really are, and what they really believe in. But that is a possibility which Marx did not comprehensively theorize in Das Kapital.

Engels
The mask metaphor appears in the early writings of Friedrich Engels, and his influence on Marx is often underestimated.

In 1894, Engels referred to character masks in his Preface to Capital, Volume III – when rebutting a criticism of Marx's theory by Achille Loria. Engels's substantive sociological suggestion seems to be that:

in a society's progressive, constructive era, its best characters come to the fore, and no character masks are necessary for them.
when society degenerates and submits to intolerable conditions, it not only gives rise to all sorts of dubious, talentless characters who cannot lead the way forward, but also society's dignity can only be sustained by masking the social contradictions.
based on comprehensive knowledge of a country and its national psychology, it is possible to specify the types of personalities who exemplify the nature of the era.

The problem with this kind of argument is just that, in defining the meaning of what is happening in society, it is very difficult to provide definite scientific proof that this meaning is the objective truth. It remains an interpretation, which may make sense of things at a certain level, without providing the whole truth. Engels's comment illustrates that the concept of character masks is not infrequently used in a polemical way to describe a false or inauthentic representation.

Engels, like Marx, also used the notion of a "mask" in the more general sense of a political "guise" or "disguise", for example in several of his historical analyses about religious movements.

Marxist theories

Early Marxism
In his biography of Marx, Franz Mehring refers to character masks, but more in the sense of Weberian ideal types or stereotypical characters.
The Marx-Studien published by Rudolf Hilferding and Max Adler referred to character masks as a theoretical category.
The communist dramatist Bertolt Brecht made extensive use of neutral and character masks. In plays such as The Caucasian Chalk Circle and The Good Person of Szechwan, the masks support what Brecht called "the alienation effect" (see distancing effect).

Lukács
György Lukács referred to the "very important category of economic character masks", but he never provided a substantive analysis of its meaning. He only referred candidly to his own "Socratic mask" in a 1909 love letter to a friend. In a 1909 essay, Lukács opined that "the bourgeois way of life" is "only a mask", which "like all masks" negates something, i.e. the bourgeois mask denies vital parts of human life, in the interests of money-making.

Lukács restricted the application of the idea to capitalists only, claiming that Marx had considered capitalists as "mere character masks" – meaning that capitalists, as the personifications ("agents") of capital, did not do anything "without making a business out of it", given that their activity consisted of the correct management and calculation of the objective effects of economic laws. Marx himself never simply equated capitalists with their character masks; they were human beings entangled in a certain life predicament, like anybody else. Capitalists became the "personification" of their capital, because they had money which was permanently invested somewhere, and which necessarily had to obtain a certain yield. At most one could say that capitalists had more to hide, and that some had personal qualities enabling them to succeed in their function, while others lacked the personal prerequisites. According to Lukács, the character masks of the bourgeoisie express a "necessary false consciousness" about the class consciousness of the proletariat.

Post-war Western Marxism
In the post-war tradition of Western Marxism, the concept of character masks was theorized about especially by scholars of the Frankfurt School, and other Marxists influenced by this school. Most of the Frankfurt theorists believed in Freud's basic model of human nature. Erich Fromm expanded it by developing the social-psychological concept of "social character".
It also appears in Marxist-existentialist thought, such as in the writings of Jean-Paul Sartre. In his famous book Being and Time, Heidegger distinguished between the "they-self", i.e. the self that is just "being there", in common view, and the authentic self, the "self-aware" self who explicitly grasps his own identity.
In a radical synthesis of Marx and Freud, Wilhelm Reich created the concept of "character armor". It refers to the total "harness" of physiological defences which mask off the pain of repressing feelings – feelings which the individual is not permitted to express in civil life, or is unable to express adequately. Masking is nowadays acknowledged by behavioural scientists to be also a purely biological or psychophysical process in sentient organisms: neurologically, the subjective experience of some perceived stimuli by the organism is modified or distorted by the intervention of other perceived stimuli. It can have a critically important effect on the ability of the organism to make choices, orient itself, or display sensitivity. Reich's idea was developed further by Arthur Janov, where the primal scream breaks through the masks of the body and its behaviour.
In the philosophy of the Marxist semiotician Roland Barthes, the mask features primarily as a "sign" with fixed meanings.
The concept of character masks was used by Anglo-Saxon Western Marxist or post-Marxist thinkers like Perry Anderson, Werner Bonefeld, Paul Connerton, Michael Eldred, Russell Jacoby, Lawrence Krader, and Michael Perelman. János Kornai also refers to it. In Germany and Austria, the concept has been used in the Marxian tradition by Elmar Altvater, Ingo Elbe, Wolfgang Fritz Haug, Michael Heinrich, Robert Kurz, Ernst Lohoff, Klaus Ottomeyer, and Franz Schandl (as cited in the notes).

Theodor Adorno
Adorno argues that Marx explained convincingly why the appearance-form and the real nature of human relations often does not directly coincide, not on the strength of a metaphysical philosophy such as transcendental realism, but by inferring the social meaning of human relations from the way they observably appear in practical life – using systematic critical and logical thought as a tool of discovery. Every step in the analysis can be logically and empirically tested. The hermeneutic assumption is that these relations require shared meanings in order to be able to function and communicate at all. These shared presuppositions have an intrinsic rationality, because human behaviour – ultimately driven by the need to survive – is to a large extent purposive (teleological), and not arbitrary or random (though some of it may be). If the "essential relationships" never became visible or manifest in any way, no science would be possible at all, only speculative metaphysics. It is merely that sense data require correct interpretation – they do not have a meaning independently of their socially mediated interpretation. In that sense, the mask presupposes the existence of something which for the time being remains invisible, but which can be revealed when one discovers what is behind the mask. It may be that the essence suddenly reveals itself on the stage of history, or more simply that the understandings which one already has, are altered so that the essence of the thing is finally grasped.

Frankfurt School analysis
Inspired by Marx's concept of character masks, the founder of the Frankfurt School, Max Horkheimer, began to work out a critical, social-psychological understanding of human character in the so-called Dämmerung period (in 1931/34). Horkheimer stated the Frankfurt School perspective clearly:

The Frankfurt School, and especially Herbert Marcuse, was also concerned with how people might rebel against or liberate themselves from the character-masks of life in bourgeois society, through asserting themselves authentically as social, political and sexual beings. The Frankfurt School theorists intended to show, that if in bourgeois society things appear other than they really are, this masking is not simply attributable to the disguises of competitive business relationships in the marketplace. It is rooted in the very psychological make-up, formation and behaviour of individual people. In their adaptation to bourgeois society, they argued, people internalize specific ways of concealing and revealing what they do, repressing some of their impulses and expressing others. If people are dominated, they are not dominated only by forces external to themselves, but by ideas and habits which they have internalized, and accept as being completely "natural". Max Horkheimer puts it as follows: "The principle of domination, based originally on brute force, acquired in the course of time a more spiritual character. The inner voice took the place of the master in issuing commands."

Contradictory masks
The "masking" of an alienated life, and the attempts to counteract it, are thought of in these Marxist theories as co-existing but contradictory processes, involving constant conflicts between what people really are, how they present themselves, and what they should be according to some external requirement imposed on them – a conflict which involves a perpetual struggle from which people can rarely totally withdraw, because they still depend for their existence on others, and have to face them, masked or unmasked.

The struggle for identity
To the extent that the commercial and public roles impose heavy personal burdens, and little space exists anymore "to be oneself", people can experience personal stress, mental suffering and personal estrangement (alienation), sometimes to the point where they "lose themselves", and no longer "know who they are" (identity crisis).
People may continue to function routinely ("the silent compulsion of economic relations"), sublimating, suppressing or masking the contradictions, perhaps in a schizoid way, as a zombie, as a psychopath, or by becoming withdrawn. In that case, Erich Fromm argues, human beings can become wholly conformist "automatons" ("the automation of the individual") in which a "pseudo self" replaces the "original self" – "The pseudo self is only an agent who actually represents the role a person is supposed to play, but who does so under the name of the self."

Ultimately, there exists no individual solution to such identity problems, because to solve them requires the positive recognition, acceptance and affirmation of an identity by others – and this can only happen, if the individual can "join in" and receive social acknowledgement of his identity. Marx himself tackled this problem – rather controversially – in his 1843/44 essay "On the Jewish Question".

Recent controversies

Dialectical difficulties
Much of the scientific controversy about Marx's concept of character masks centres on his unique dialectical approach to analyzing the forms and structure of social relations in the capitalist system: in Das Kapital, he had dealt with persons (or "economic characters") only insofar as they personified or symbolized – often in a reified way – economic categories, roles, functions and interests (see above). According to Marx, the capitalist system functioned as a "system", precisely because the bourgeois relations of production and trade, including property rights, were imposed on people whether they liked it or not. They had to act and conform in a specific way to survive and prosper. As the mass of capital produced grew larger, and markets expanded, these bourgeois relations spontaneously reproduced themselves on a larger and larger scale, be it with the assistance of state aid, regulation or repression. However, many authors have argued that this approach leaves many facets of capitalist social relations unexplained. In particular, it is not so easy to understand the interactions between individuals and the society of which they are part, in such a way, that each is both self-determining and determined by the other.

Marx's concept of character masks has been interrogated by scholars primarily in the German-language literature. Werner Sombart stated in 1896 (two years after Capital, Volume III was published) that "We want a psychological foundation of social events and Marx did not bother about it".

Soviet Union
The historian Sheila Fitzpatrick has recorded how, in the Soviet Union, "The theatrical metaphor of masks was ubiquitous in the 1920s and '30s, and the same period saw a flowering of that peculiar form of political theater: the show trial." Those who supported the revolution and its communist leadership were politically defined as "proletarian" and those who opposed it were defined as "bourgeois". The enemies of the revolution had to be hunted down, unmasked, and forced to confess their counter-revolutionary (i.e. subversive) behaviour, whether real or imagined. It led to considerable political paranoia. Abandoning bourgeois and primitive norms, and becoming a cultured, socialist citizen, was "akin to learning a role". In the 1920s, the Russian Association of Proletarian Writers (RAPP) adopted the slogan "tear off each and every mask from reality". This was based on a quotation from Lenin, who wrote in his 1908 essay on Leo Tolstoy as mirror of the Russian revolution that the "realism of Tolstoy was the tearing off of each and every mask"(sryvanie vsekh i vsiacheskikh masok). The communist authorities kept detailed files on the class and political credentials of citizens, leading to what historians call "file-selves".

Much later, in 1973 (16 years before Slavoj Žižek entered the intellectual scene) the German New Left critic Michael Schneider claimed that:

According to this interpretation, there was a "blind spot" in Marx's explanation of bourgeois society, because he had disregarded psychological factors. Moreover, Marxists had interpreted Marx's theory of the "personification of economic functions" as an alternative to psychology as such. Thus, equipped with a simplistic "reflection theory of consciousness" and an "objectivist concept of class consciousness", the Russian revolutionaries (naively) assumed that once the bourgeois had been liberated from his property, and the institutions of capitalism were destroyed, then there was no more need for masking anything – society would be open, obvious and transparent, and resolving psychological problems would become a purely practical matter (the "re-engineering of the human soul"). Very simply put, the idea was that "the solution of psychological problems is communism". However, Raymond A. Bauer suggests that the communist suspicion of psychological research had nothing directly to do with the idea of "character masks" as such, but more with a general rejection of all approaches which were deemed "subjectivist" and "unscientific" in a positivist sense (see positivism).

The USSR became increasingly interested in conceptions of human nature which facilitated social control by the communist party, and from this point of view, too, the concept of the unconscious was problematic and a nuisance: by definition, the unconscious is something which cannot easily be controlled consciously. However, psychoanalysis was considered bourgeois; this situation began to change only gradually Nikita Khrushchev had made his famous secret speech, in which he condemned the "personality cult" around Stalin (see "On the Personality Cult and Its Consequences"). The obligatory official broadsides against Freud and the neo-Freudians in the Soviet Union ceased only from 1972, after which psychoanalysis was to a large extent rehabilitated.

The New Left and the Red Army Faction
The New Left was a radical trend which began in 1956/57, a time when large numbers of intellectuals around the world resigned from the "Old Left" Communist parties in protest against the Soviet invasion of Hungary during the Hungarian Revolution of 1956. These New Left intellectuals broke with the official Marxism–Leninism ideology, and they founded new magazines, clubs and groups, which in turn strongly influenced a new generation of students. They began to study Marx afresh, to find out what he had really meant.

In Germany, the term Charaktermaske was popularized in the late 1960s and in the 1970s especially by "red" Rudi Dutschke, one of the leaders of the student radicals. By "character masks", Dutschke meant essentially that the official political personalities and business leaders were merely the interchangeable "human faces", the representatives or puppets masking an oppressive system; one could not expect anything else from them, than what the system required them to do. Focusing on individual personalities was a distraction from fighting the system they represented.

According to the German educationist Ute Grabowski,

The positive utopian longing emerging in the 1960s was that of reaching a life situation in which people would be able to meet each other naturally, spontaneously and authentically, freed from any constraints of rank or status, archaic rituals, arbitrary conventions and old traditions. In their social criticism, the youth began to rebel against the roles which were formally assigned to them, and together with that, began to question the social theory of roles, which presented those roles as natural, necessary and inevitable. In particular, the women's liberation movement began to challenge gender roles as sexist and patriarchal. There seemed to be a big gap between the façade of roles, and the true nature of social relationships, getting in the way of personal authenticity (being "for real"). Official politics was increasingly regarded as the "masquerade" of those in power. To illustrate the spirit of the times, Anne-Marie Rocheblave-Spenlé who had previously authored a classic French text on role theory, in 1974 published a book titled, significantly, Le Pouvoir Demasque (Power unmasked).

The concept of "character masks" was by no means an unimportant political concept in Germany, since it was being used explicitly by terrorists in their justifications for assassinating people.

Ten points of controversy
Questions subsequently arose in New Left circles about ten issues:

whether behaviour is in truth an "act" or whether it is "for real", and how one could know or prove that (the problem of authenticity).
whether character exists at all, if "masks mask other masks" in an endless series
how people make other people believe what their real character is (see also charisma).
the extent to which masks "of some sort" are normal, natural, necessary and inevitable in civilized society (or given a certain population density).
whether there can be objective tests of character masks as a scientific concept, or whether they are a polemical, partisan characterization.
the extent to which the device of "character masks" is only an abstraction or a metaphor, or whether it is a valid empirical description of aspects of real human behaviour in capitalist society.
what is specific about the character masks of capitalist society, and how this should be explained.
whether the "masks" of a social system are in any way the same as the masks of individuals.
to what extent people are telling a story about the world, or whether they are really telling a story about themselves, given that the mask may not be adequate and other people can "see through it" anyway.
whether Marx's idea of character masks contains an ethnocentric or gender bias.

German sociologist Uri Rapp theorized that Charaktermaske was not the same as "role"; rather Charaktermaske was a role forced on people, in a way that they could not really escape from it, i.e. all their vital relationships depended on it. People were compelled by the relations of production. Thus, he said, "every class membership is a Charaktermaske and even the ideological penetration of masquerades (the 'class consciousness of the proletariat') could not change or cast off character masks, only transcend them in thought." In addition, Charaktermaske was "present in the issue of the human being alienated from his own personality."

Jean L. Cohen complained that:

As the post-war economic boom collapsed in the 1970s, and big changes in social roles occurred, these kinds of controversies stimulated a focus by social theorists on the "social construction of personal identity". A very large academic literature was subsequently published on this topic, exploring identity-formation from many different angles. The discourse of identity resonated well with the concerns of adolescents and young adults who are finding their identity, and it has been a popular subject ever since. Another reason for the popularity of the topic, noted by Richard Sennett in his book The corrosion of character, is the sheer number of different jobs people nowadays end up doing during their lifetime. People then experience multiple changes of identity in their lifetime – their identity is no longer fixed once and for all.

Humanism and anti-humanism
Marx's "big picture" of capitalism often remained supremely abstract, although he claimed ordinary folks could understand his book. It seemed to many scholars that in Marx's Capital people become "passive subjects" trapped in a system which is beyond their control, and which forces them into functions and roles. Thus, it is argued that Marx's portrayal of the capitalist system in its totality is too "deterministic", because it downplays the ability of individuals as "active human subjects" to make free choices, and determine their own fate (see also economic determinism). The theoretical point is stated by Peter Sloterdijk as follows:

In the antihumanist version, the individual is viewed as "a creation of the system" or "a product of society" who personifies a social function. In this case, a person selected to represent and express a function is no more than a functionary (or a "tool"): the person himself is the character mask adopted by the system or the organization of which he is part. Hidden behind the human face is the (inhuman) system which it operates. In the humanist version, the process is not one of personification, but rather of impersonation, in which case the function is merely a role acted out by the individual. Since the role acted out may in this case not have much to do with the individual's true personality, the mask-bearer and the mask he bears are, in this case, two different things – creating the possibility of a conflict between the bearer and the role he plays. Such a conflict is generally not possible in the antihumanist interpretation ("if you work for so-and-so, you are one of them"), since any "dysfunctional" character mask would simply be replaced by another.

Louis Althusser's anti-humanism
In the antihumanist philosophy of the French Marxist Louis Althusser, individuals as active subjects who have needs and make their own choices, and as people who "make their own history", are completely eradicated in the name of "science". In fact, Althusser recommended the psychological theory of Sigmund Freud and Jacques Lacan in the French Communist Party journal La Nouvelle Critique specifically as a "science of the (human) unconscious". In the glossary of his famous book Reading Capital (co-written with Étienne Balibar), Althusser announces:

Critics of this idea argue people are not merely the "bearers" of social relations, they are also the "conscious operators" of social relations – social relations which would not exist at all, unless people consciously interacted and cooperated with each other. The real analytical difficulty in social science is, that people both make their social relations, but also participate in social relations which they did not make or consciously choose themselves. Some roles in society are consciously and voluntarily chosen by individuals, other roles are conferred on people simply by being and participating in society with a given status. Some roles are also a mixture of both: once people have chosen a role, they may have that role, whether they like it or not; or, once habituated to role, people continue to perform the role even although they could in principle choose to abandon it. That is why both the humanist and the antihumanist interpretations of character masks can have some validity in different situations.

According to some critics, Althusser's "totalizing perspective" – which, by destroying the dialectics of experience, cannot reconcile the ways in which people "make history" and are "made by history", and therefore falls from one contradiction into another and destroys belief in the power of human action (because "the system" dominates everything).

The sociological imagination
C. Wright Mills developed a concept known as the sociological imagination, the idea being that understanding the link between "private troubles" and "public issues" requires creative insight by the researchers, who are personally involved in what they try to study. The analytical question for social scientists then is, how much the concept of "character masks" can really explain, or whether its application is overextended or overworked.

For example, Jon Elster argued that:

Jürgen Ritsert, a Frankfurt sociologist, queried the utility of the concept of character masks:

Sociobiology
Faced with the problem of understanding human character masks – which refers to how human beings have to deal with the relationship between the "macro-world" (the big world) and the "micro-world" (the small world) – scholarship has often flip-flopped rather uneasily between structuralism and subjectivism, inventing dualisms between structure and agency. The academic popularity of structural-functionalism has declined, "role definitions" have become more and more changeable and vague, and the Althusserian argument has been inverted: human behaviour is explained in terms of sociobiology. Here, "the person" is identified with "the physical body". This is closer to Marx's idea of "the economic formation of society as a process of natural history", but often at the cost of "naturalizing" (eternalizing) social phenomena which belong to a specific historical time – by replacing their real, man-made social causes with alleged biological factors. On this view, humans (except ourselves) are essentially, and mainly, animals. The treatment of humans as if they are animals is itself a strategy of domination.

Postmodernism
The more recent postmodern criticism of Marx's portrayal of character masks concerns mainly the two issues of personal identity and privacy.

It is argued that modern capitalism has moved far beyond the type of capitalism that Marx knew. Capitalist development has changed the nature of people themselves, and how one's life will go is more and more unpredictable. There is no longer any clear and consensual view of how "personal identity" or "human character" should be defined (other than by identity cards). It is also no longer clear what it means to "mask" them, or what interests that can serve. Roles are constantly being redefined to manipulate power relationships, and shunt people up or down the hierarchy.

The postmodern concept of human identity maximizes the flexibility, variability and plasticity of human behaviour, so that the individual can "be and do many different things, in many different situations", without any necessary requirement of continuity between different "acts" in space and time. The effect as a lack of coherence;  becomes more difficult to know or define what the identity of someone truly is. As soon as the self is viewed as a performance, masking becomes an intrinsic aspect of the self, since there still exists an "I" which directs the performance and which therefore simultaneously "reveals and conceals" itself. The corollary is, that it becomes much more difficult to generalize about human beings.  The most basic level the categories or units used to make comparisons remain vague. At most, one can objectively measure the incidence and frequency of different types of observable behaviour.

Aggregate human behaviour is then often explained either as a biological effect or as a statistical effect, estimated by probability theory. Some Marxists regard this perspective as a form of dehumanization, which signifies a deepening of human alienation, and leads to a return to religion to define humanity. Modern information technology and the sexual revolution, it is nowadays argued, have radically altered the whole idea of what is "public" and what is "private". Increasingly, information technology becomes a tool for social control. Some Marxists even refer to the spectre of totalitarian capitalism. Human individuals then appear to be caught up in a stressful battle to defend their own definition of themselves against the definitions imposed or attributed by others, in which they can become trapped.

Kurz and Lohoff
In their famous 1989 article "The class struggle fetish", the German neo-Marxists Robert Kurz and Ernst Lohoff reached the conclusion that the working class is ultimately just "the character mask of variable capital", a logical "real category" of Capital. The identities of all members of capitalist society, they argued, are ultimately formed as bourgeois character masks of self-valorizing value. In that case, people are valued according to the extent that they can make money for themselves, or for others.

Žižek
Slavoj Žižek attempts to create a new theory of masks, by mixing together the philosophies of Hegel, Karl Marx and Jacques Lacan with his understanding of fictional literature and political events. In Žižek's theory, oppressive social reality cannot exist and persist without ideological mystification, "The mask is not simply hiding the real state of things; the ideological distortion is written into [the] very essence [of the real state of things]." Thus, the mask is a necessary and integral component of an oppressive reality, and it is not possible to tear away the mask to reveal the oppressive reality underneath.

In The sublime object of ideology, Žižek summarizes Peter Sloterdijk's concept of cynical reason:

Often the pretense is kept up, because of a belief (or anxiety) that the alternative – i.e. dropping the pretense – would result in a negative effect, and compromise cherished values or beliefs. To maintain and build a team morale, results are dependent on shared beliefs, regardless of the integrity and awareness of those belief's within reality.  The result, Žižek claims, is a "symbolic order" of "fetishist disavowal" in which people act morally "as if" they are related in certain ways – to the point where "the symbolic mask matters more than the direct reality of the individual who wears this mask." Using a Freudian theory, Žižek aims to explain the psychological processes by which people are reconciled with the symbolic order, or at least make it "liveable" for themselves (see also Freudo-Marxism).

Frank Furedi suggests that the concept of denial, central to Žižek's understanding of masks, has a stark contrast from contemporary post-Freudian society: "In today's therapy culture, people who express views that contradict our own are often told that they are 'in denial'.  It has become a way of discrediting their viewpoint, or shutting them up." If people disagree, or will not cooperate, they are not taken seriously in a dialogue, but accused of having a psychological problem which stands in need of professional treatment. Thus, a dissident is neutralized by being turned into a patient who is "unhealthy", and people are managed according to psychotherapeutic concepts designed to invalidate their own meanings. Furedi implies that yesterday's leftist concepts can be recycled as today's tools for psychological manipulation: an idea which originally had a progressive intention can evolve until, in reality, it plays the very opposite role – even although (and precisely because) people continue to sentimentally cherish the old idea. The point is not simply to interpret the processes by which oppressed people are reconciled with, or reproduce their own oppression (Althusser's and Bourdieu's structuralist theory of "ideological reproduction"); the challenge is to create new ideas which can free the oppressed out of their oppression. For this purpose, ideas have to be situated according to how they are actually being used in the real world, and the oppressed have to be regarded as active subjects who can change their own fate.

Philip Rieff summarizes the main problem, and the main achievement of psychoanalysis, from the point of view of freeing people from the masks that may oppress them:

If it is true that "we do not even know who we are", then it becomes difficult to understand how people could free themselves from deceptive masks, and change the world for the better, unless they all get a massive dose of psychotherapy to "find themselves".

Unmasking
If one successfully unmasks something, one understands it for what it really is, and can handle it; inversely, if one understands something and can handle it, it is unmasked. Yet, as Marx notes, "in the analysis of economic forms neither microscopes nor chemical reagents are of assistance. The power of abstraction must replace both."

Economic analysis not only studies the total social effect of human actions, which is usually not directly observable to an individual, other than in the form of statistics or television. The "economic actors" are also human beings who create interactions and relationships which have human meanings. Those meanings cannot be observed directly, they are in people's heads, actively created in their social relationships, and expressed symbolically.

Collapse
Capitalism unmasks itself in the course of development, when its internal contradictions become so great, that they cause collapse – impelling the revolutionary transformation of capitalism by human action into a new social order, amidst all the political conflicts and class struggles. In trying to get on top of the relations they have created, human beings are themselves transformed. Scientific inquiry, Marx felt, should be an aid in the cause of human progress, to ensure that the new social order emerging will be a real open society. Human progress is achieved, to the degree that people abolish the oppressions of people by other people, and oppressions by the blind forces of nature.

See also 
 Art and morality
 Crystallized self
 Honne and tatemae
 Identity management
 Moral character
 Theatre of the Oppressed

Notes

Marxist theory
Identity (social science)
Sociological terminology